KB Home is a homebuilding company based in the United States, founded in 1957 as Kaufman & Broad in Detroit, Michigan. It was the first company to be traded on the NYSE as a home builder. Its headquarters are in Los Angeles, California.

The company has built 600,000 homes since its founding. It builds homes primarily for first-time home buyers.

History

1956–2007 
KB Home was founded in Detroit in 1956 by Donald Bruce Kaufman and Eli Broad. Their first venture together was the construction of two model homes in the Northeast Detroit suburbs, where a new generation of first-time home buyers were flocking. By streamlining the construction process and eliminating basements, offering a carport instead, they could price the houses so the monthly mortgage would be less than the rent for a two-bedroom apartment. Kaufman and Broad christened this model the "Award Winner" and priced it at $13,700.  After one weekend, seventeen were sold and within two years, Kaufman and Broad had built 600 homes in the Detroit suburbs.

In 1960, fearing that the Detroit economy was too dependent on the automotive business, they moved to Phoenix, Arizona and expanded into California in 1963, and in 1967 were the first U.S. homebuilders to expand into France.  The company completed an initial public offering in 1986, and from that time was known as Kaufman and Broad Home Corporation until 2001, when its name was shortened to KB Home.

The company has periodically acquired other homebuilders as it expanded into new markets. These purchases included New Mexico-based Opnel Jenkins in 1995, San Antonio-based Rayco Homes in 1996, Tucson, Arizona-based Estes Homes in 1998, and Upland, California-based Colony Homes in 2003.  It also maintained a division in France, which was sold in 2007.

As part of a promotion, in 1997 the company built a life-sized replica of The Simpsons cartoon home in Henderson, Nevada.  It has since engaged in homebuilding promotions with Martha Stewart (2005), The Walt Disney Company (2008) and The Ellen DeGeneres Show (2012).

In 2001 KB Home was sued when homeowners in a subdivision in Arlington, Texas discovered that their homes were built on top of a practice bombing range from the 1940s and 50s which the military had cleared for development. That suit has since been settled. The Army Corps of Engineers was engaged in remediation.

In November 2006, KB Home president, CEO, and chairman Bruce Karatz resigned after an internal accounting probe into his alleged backdating of stock options.  KB Home also announced the resignation of its head of human resources, Gary A. Ray, and the resignation of its chief legal officer, Richard B. Hirst. The company determined that Karatz and Ray had picked grant dates under the company's stock option plans. According to the Wall Street Journal, Karatz was one of the most highly paid executives in 2005, earning almost $156 million, primarily from options.

In 2006, Karatz was succeeded by Jeffrey T. Mezger as CEO.

2008–present 
In April 2008, KB Home published its first sustainability report, which outlined the company's environmental, social responsibility and economic sustainability accomplishments. The company has since produced this report annually for 15 years, with the latest report released in April 2022.

The company was named "Most Admired Homebuilder" by Fortune in 2006, 2008, 2009, and 2011. 
KB Home was ranked #1 Overall Green Builder by Calvert Investments in 2010.

In March 2011, KB Home, in partnership with SunPower, introduced its first community with solar as a standard feature.

In fiscal year 2012, the company delivered 6,282 homes in the United States and had revenue of over $1.5 billion. This revenue figure is down from 2005 (at the height of the real estate boom), when the company delivered close to 40,000 homes and had more than $9 billion in revenue.

In 2016 KB Home settled a multi-million dollar lawsuit with the Florida Attorney General's Office for shoddy and defective construction repairs on homes that were built wrong in the first place. 

In January 2019, KB Home, in partnership with Builder Magazine, built a model home called KB Home ProjeKt, in Henderson, Nevada. The home was intended to showcase sustainability, smart home technology and home building technology that supports the occupant's mental, emotional and physical health, like circadian cycle lighting, antimicrobial paint and smart air purifiers.

In February 2020, KB Home partnered with former Minnesota Vikings defensive end Jared Allen’s Homes 4 Wounded Warriors and built a mortgage-free new home for veterans of the U.S. Air Force who sustained combat-related injuries in Afghanistan and Iraq.

In August 2020, KB Home introduced the KB Home Office, a partially customizable home office package targeting remote workers.

In October 2020, KB Home was recognized by the United States Environmental Protection Agency and awarded its WaterSense Sustained Excellence Award. This was the fourth consecutive year in which KB Home received the award.

In April 2022, KB Home earned its 12th Energy Star Partner of the Year – Sustained Excellence Award. In July, the company confirmed plans to build homes in California, Nevada, and Arizona to meet the Environmental Protection Agency’s WaterSense specifications. In November, the company announced it had established the first all-electric solar and battery-powered microgrid community in California. The following month, Newsweek listed KB Home as one of America’s Most Responsible Companies for environmental and social responsibilities.

GreenHouse
KB Home built the company's first net-zero-energy home in January 2011. The GreenHouse was designed by KB Home and Martha Stewart and was featured as the "Idea Home" at the International Builders Show that year. The house is located in Windermere, Florida.

ZeroHouse 2.0
The successor to the GreenHouse is the ZeroHouse 2.0, which combines energy efficiency measures and solar panels to achieve net-zero energy usage. Introduced in 2011, the first model ZeroHouse 2.0 was built in Tampa, FL, closely followed by models in San Antonio and Austin, TX.

KB Home expanded the ZeroHouse 2.0 to the Mid-Atlantic states in June 2012 with the unveiling of the first of its kind in Waldorf, Maryland. The 4,000-square-foot model home project was completed with the installation of a 40-panel SunPower system by Solar Energy World.

See also

Notes

External links 

1957 establishments in Michigan
1980s initial public offerings
Companies based in Los Angeles
Companies listed on the New York Stock Exchange
Construction and civil engineering companies established in 1957
Construction and civil engineering companies of the United States
Home builders